Altura is a populated place in Archuleta County, Colorado, United States.

Geography
Altura is located at  (37.1833377,-107.1911544).

References 

Geography of Archuleta County, Colorado